The Little Angels Children’s Folk Ballet of Korea is a Korean traditional art and dance troupe made up of elementary and middle school children, founded in 1962 by Sun Myung Moon, the founder of the Unification Church, to project a positive image of South Korea to the world. In 1973 they performed at the United Nations Headquarters in New York City. The group’s dances are based on Korean legends and regional dances, and its costumes on traditional Korean styles. Choral singing by the troupe in many languages is also featured.

The Little Angels are supported financially by the Tongil Group, a South Korean business group associated with the Unification Church, through the Tongil Foundation. The Little Angels are part of the Sunhwa Arts School. School fees are sponsored by Sunhwa Educational Foundation so that any talented girl can apply.

History 
Little Angels were established as Daehan Children's Art Troupe on May 5, 1962. It was the time, when South Korea was ravaged by the Korean war. From the very beginning, the mission of the school was to be ambassadors of peace and goodwill, and use creativity to counter the image of Korea at that time, symbolized by famine, poverty, and abandonment, by spreading the 5000-year-old Korean cultural traditions.

In 1965 permission was granted to establish the Little Angels art school for 720 students and 12 classes.

In 1974, the Little Angels Art Education Center was completed. The newly opened school, called Little Angels School of Arts, accepted 240 pupils. The school was opened by Bo-hi Pak who became the first principal of the school.

In 1975, Sunhwa Academy was founded and Bo-hi Pak was named the first president.

In 1976, Sunhwa Arts High School was accredited and the following year the school was renamed from Little Angels Art School to Sunhwa Art School and Little Angels Troupe become a part of the school with a broader artistic focus. 

From 1965 to 1988 they performed over 2000 shows in 40 countries and until 2015 over 7000 shows and 70 foreign tours in 60 countries.

In May 1998, they performed as part of the cultural diplomacy of the founders in Pyongyang, the Democratic People's Republic of Korea. The North Korean leadership subsequently sent a Pyongyang school team to tour South Korea in May 2000.

In 1990, they performed in Moscow and the then First Lady Raisa Gorbacheva was also a guest.

In 2010, on the 60th anniversary of the Korean War, the Korean government with the Korean War 60th Anniversary Memorial Committee sponsored a Little Angels tour to all countries participating in the 1950 UN appeal for the defense of Korea. Little Angels started their tour in Norfolk, United States because of ties of the city to General McArthur, who according to officiators turned the momentum of the war. Later that year they traveled to the other 15 nations that had sent troops to support South Korea in the United Nations force.

Repertoire 
The repertoire of Little Angels is classical Korean dance, singing, and playing traditional Korean musical instruments.
 Chorus – accompanied by their conductor at the piano singing international songs and tunes from Korea.
 Dances:
 New Years' Day – since 2021, Choreography Bae Jung-hae, the theme of the Lunar New Year (Seollal) celebration.
 Peace Road – since 2020, Choreography Bae Jung-hae, dance promoting Peace, global human family, harmony, and cooperation.
 Jinsoe Festival – an adaptation of the traditional Korean dance "Jinsoe Chum” with gwengwaris (small Korean gongs).
 Hwageom – dance inspired by the Wonhwa, ladies from the elite class of Hwarang in the Silla Dynasty.
 Palace – an adaptation of traditional court dances with hansam (flowing extended sleeves) movements.
 Miyal – dance drama of the Miyal story using a fan.
 Folk Singing with Gayageum – group performance with gayageum, a musical instrument that originated in the Gaya kingdom and passed on to the Shilla Dynasty.
 Moon Festival – performance of the Moon Festival (Ganggangsullae), in Korea symbolizing the defense of the fatherland. Dance Ganggangsullae is listed as UNESCO World Heritage.
 Doll Dance – dance inspired by a Korean tradition - a literal doll dance performed on the lunar new year.
 Farm Dance – an expression of the farmer’s thanksgiving during the fruitful autumn harvest season.
 Warrior’s Dance – inspired by general Gim Yu-sin and the Hwarang order in the 7th century, using a melody of the Ballad of Gyeongbuk Palace.
 Travel by Night – dance story from the Korean past, when grandfather carries his granddaughter through the night.
 Fan Dance – dance with a fan, which is the symbol of noblesse, a part of Korean tradition.
 Drum Dance – rhythmic dance with 6 standing drums symbolizes tensions between body and soul.
 Wedding Day – a dance story of a ludicrous wedding in ancient times, when a very young boy is called to take a much older bride.
 Hourglass Drum Dance – rhythmic dance with a long, hourglass-shaped drum.
 Toy Soldiers – dance of the toy soldiers to the music of the Radetzky March, first performed for Queen Elizabeth II. on November 15, 1971.
 Spring Time – dance of spring-time traditions.
 The Legend of Chunhyang – puppet-style dance story of the love and fidelity of Korean heroine Chunhyang towards her fiancé.
 Mask Dance – dance with masks of various kinds is a traditional part of local cultural festivals of ancient Korea.
 Flower Crown Dance – a modern adaptation of Korean traditional court dance.

Discography 

Albums:

 The Little Angels, Vinyl LP (Label: Philips – 6308 137), UK, Australia 1972
 The Little Angels Smile, Vinyl LP (Label: MGM Records – SE-4927, Special Products Division), USA 1973
 The Little Angels, Vinyl LP (Label: Philips – 6308 137, Fontana – SEL-100092), South Korea, Jul 21, 1973
 리틀 엔젤스 애창곡 (Little Angels Favorite Songs), CD (SKC SKCD-C-0003), South Korea, March 1, 1987
 The Little Angels Sing - X-Mas Cards, CD (SKC SKCD-0057),1987 
 Les Petits Anges De Corée – Bienvenue À Séoul, CD (Label: Forlane – UCD 19014), 1988
 Little Angels Pyongyang Performance Special, CD 1998
 공연실황 - 화관무/부채춤/강강수월래 (Live performance - Hwagwanmu / Fan dance / Ganggangsuwolae), Laser Disc (Label. SKC SKST-2003), 2003
 리틀엔젤스예술단 – 창단 50주년 특집 (Little Angels Art Troupe – Special performance on the 50th anniversary of its founding), CD (self-released), 2012

Singles & EPs:

 The Little Angels National Folk Ballet Of Korea – Children Of The World Unite, Vinyl SP (Label: Philips – 6006 270), Netherlands 1972
 The Little Angels National Folk Ballet Of Korea – Mother Of Mine, Vinyl SP (Label: Philips – 6006 257), United Kingdom 1972
 The Little Angels – Dominique / Echo Of The Angels, Vinyl SP (Label: MGM Records – K-14657), USA 1973
 The Little Angels – Children Of The World Unite, Vinyl SP (Label: Philips – 6006 270), New Zealand 1973
 The Little Angels – Dominique / Mother Of Mine, Vinyl SP (Label: Philips – SFL 1768), Japan
 8.15 광복절 기념 리틀엔젤스 합창곡 모음 (8.15 Liberation Day Celebration Little Angels Choral Songs), 2021

Overseas tours 
List of overseas tours:

Notable alumni 

 Sumi Jo - operatic soprano
 Young-ok Shin - coloratura soprano
 Kang Sue-jin - primabalerina in Stuttgart ballet
 Park, Han-byul - actress and model
 Hwang, Jung-eum - actress and singer
 Hoon-suk Moon - director of Universal Ballet
 Deok-su Kim - professor at Korea National University of Arts
 Shim Sook-kyung - choreographer of the National Gugak Center
 Lee No-yeon - chief choreographer of Busan City Dance Company
 Hong Kyung-hee - director of Jeonbuk Provincial Dance Company
 Nam Ki-moon - representative of Samulnori, National Gugak Center
 Shin Myung-sook - head of the Department of Dance and Art at Daejin University
 Kwak Eun-ah - professor of Korean Music at Ewha Womans University
 Jeon Eun-ja - professor of dance at Sungkyunkwan University
 Kim Woon-mi - professor of dance at Hanyang University
 Yu-oh Jeon - professor of dance at Seowon University
 Eun-young Park - KBS announcer

Gallery

See also
Korean dance

References

External links
Korean War 60th Anniversary Memorial

Unification Church affiliated organizations
Dance companies in South Korea
Unification Church and the arts